Ammaye Kaanaan is a 1963 Indian Malayalam-language film, directed by P. Bhaskaran and produced by V. Abdulla. The film stars Sathyan, Ambika and Baby Vinodini.

Cast
 
Sathyan as Chandran 
Madhu as Balagopal 
Ambika as Madhavi 
Adoor Bhasi as Sangameshwara Iyer 
Jose Prakash 
Kottayam Santha as Janaki Amma 
P. J. Antony as Sukumaran Nair 
Vasanthi as Rema 
Baby Vinodini as Suhasini 
Bahadoor as Nanu 
C. R. Lakshmi as Parvathi Amma 
J. A. R. Anand
KPAC Leela as Leela 
Kedamangalam Ali as Vareed 
Kottayam Chellappan as Barrister Panicker 
Kunjandi as Kuttaayi 
Kuthiravattam Pappu as Pamman 
M. G. Menon
S. P. Pillai as Sankunni Nair 
Ramesh

Soundtrack

References

External links
 

1963 films
1960s Malayalam-language films
Films directed by P. Bhaskaran